Gustave Amoudruz (23 March 1885 – 28 December 1963) was a Swiss sports shooter. He competed at the 1920 Summer Olympics winning two bronze medals.

References

External links
 

1885 births
1963 deaths
Swiss male sport shooters
Olympic shooters of Switzerland
Shooters at the 1920 Summer Olympics
Sportspeople from Geneva
Olympic bronze medalists for Switzerland
Olympic medalists in shooting
Medalists at the 1920 Summer Olympics